Nisi may refer to:

Languages
 Nisi language (India) (or Nishi), a subject–object–verb and Sino-Tibetan language of the Tani branch
 Nisi language (China), a Sino-Tibetan language, still unclassified within branches of Southeastern Loloish (or Ngwi) languages
 Nisi Kham language, a dialect of a complex of Sino-Tibetan Magaric languages

People

Given name 
 Nisi Shawl (born 1955), African-American writer and journalist
 Nisi Mac Niata (6th century), Irish Gael whose death is described in the Book of Fenagh
 Nisi ben Menasseh, 9th-century Khazar ruler

Surname 
 Aaron ben Nisi, Turkic Jewish ruler of the Khazars mentioned in the Khazar Correspondence
 Ana Nisi Goyco (1950–2019), Puerto Rican politician and pharmacist
 Nisi ben Menasseh (or Nisi ben Moses), Jewish Turkic ruler of the Khazars mentioned in the Khazar Correspondence
 Nisi Yosiyuki (born 1976), Japanese manga artist  
 Nisio Isin (born 1981), stylized NisiOisin, Japanese novelist and manga writer

Places

Greece
 Nisi, Elis, a village and a community in the municipal unit of Vouprasia
 Nisi, Grevena, a village part of the community of Kentro
 Nisi, Imathia, a settlement in Imathia 
 Nisi, Pella, a settlement in the Pella regional unit

Other places
 Albu Nisi, a village in Elhayi Rural District, Khuzestan Province, Iran
 Hajj Hasan Nisi Pumping Station, a village and company town in Hoveyzeh Rural District, Khuzestan Province, Iran
 Nishitokyo, a city in Tokyo Metropolis, Japan
 Nisi, Nepal, a village development committee in Baglung District in the Dhaulagiri Zone

Other uses 
 Asa Nisi Masa, iconic phrase used during a key scene in Federico Fellini's 1963 film 8½
 Decree nisi, a ruling by a court that does not have any force until such time that a particular condition is met
 "Nisi sam" (Your Light), a 2014 song by Slovenian preteen singer Ula Ložar